Electro Velvet are a British vocal duo that represented the United Kingdom in the Eurovision Song Contest 2015 with the song "Still in Love with You" finishing 24th. The duo consist of Alex Larke and Bianca Nicholas.

Career

Early beginnings
Nicholas has appeared both on The X Factor and The Voice UK. She has also sung a duet with Will Young and performed in front of Prince William, Catherine, Duchess of Cambridge, and Prince Harry. In 2011, Nicholas released a single "Hold On To Your Dreams", which entered the UK Top 100 singles chart. She also had a small role in the 1999 American film Sleepy Hollow with Johnny Depp. She suffers from cystic fibrosis.

Born in Welwyn Garden City, Larke is currently lead singer for The Rolling Stones tribute group The Rolling Clones, and has toured the UK and internationally with the band. He has recently worked with Big Beat pioneer Cut La Roc on his album Larger Than Life, which also features Ice-T collaborator, Donald D and Snow Patrol frontman Gary Lightbody. Larke works part-time in a primary school, and also teaches ukulele and recorder. In 2014 he worked in a special needs school with children and young adults with profound to severe learning difficulties.

On their official Facebook page, the duo thanked their fans for all their support during their time at Eurovision, as well as announcing "we'll be in touch soon about what we are up to next."

2015: Eurovision Song Contest

Electro Velvet were selected by the BBC to represent the United Kingdom in the Eurovision Song Contest 2015 with their song "Still in Love with You". The entry was presented on 7 March 2015 via the BBC Red Button service. The song received a mixed to negative reception upon its announcement. In the Eurovision final they received 5 points and were placed 24th out of 27.

The staging of the song included two pairs of additional dancers, two of whom performed breakdance and acrobatic moves. The television production involved some Busby Berkeley-style shots from above and darkened sequences during which the performers' costumes were illuminated with integral LED strip light.

On 22 June, their debut EP was launched on PledgeMusic where it was available to pre-order, along with many other exclusives. It was cancelled due to Nicholas' continued ill-health.

Discography

Singles

References

External links
Official PledgeMusic page
Official Facebook page

Eurovision Song Contest entrants for the United Kingdom
Eurovision Song Contest entrants of 2015
English pop music duos
English electronic music duos
Electro swing musicians